Providence, California, may refer to:
 Providence, Nevada County, California
 Providence, San Bernardino County, California